Guberlinsky mountains — mountain range in the east Orenburg Oblast, in basin river Guberl (right tributary Ural). Southern part of Ural Mountains.

The mountains are heavily indented by the valley Guberli, as well as by the ravines, ravine s and ravines of its tributaries. The depth of some gorges reaches . The highest peak is mountain Cross. In the southern part, the Guberlin Mountains turn into Mugodzhar Hills.

The mountains are mainly composed of tufa, siliceous and clayey slate. steppe vegetation grows on the slopes, there are mosses and lichen and. Within the mountains there are deposits of manganese, copper, iron and nickel ores (Akkerman nickel mine), chromium a, limestone and others minerals

References 

Ural Mountains